The União Nacional dos Escuteiros de Timor-Leste (UNE-TL; roughly National Scout Union of East Timor, now The Scout Association of Timor-Leste) is the national Scouting organization of East Timor. It was founded on December 2, 2005 through the merger of the Corpo de Escuteiros Católicos em Timor-Leste (Corps of Catholic Scouts of East Timor) and of Timor-Leste Scouting (East Timor Scouting). The organization is a member of the Comunidade do Escutismo Lusófono (Community of Lusophone Scouting). It became a member of the World Organization of the Scout Movement on 22 June 2017.

Dom Ximenes Belo, former Bishop of Dili and Nobel Peace Prize winner, is a former Scout and active in Scouting.

Sources

External links
 Official blog

Organizations based in East Timor
World Organization of the Scout Movement member organizations
Organizations established in 2005